The Dr. H. B. Ward House is a historic house in Cuba, Sumter County, Alabama.  The two-story, wood-frame I-house was built for Dr. Henry Bascomb (H.B.) Ward in 1880. It has architectural influences drawn from Greek Revival and late Victorian architecture.  The primary facade is five bays wide, with a one-story porch spanning the entire width.  A two-story central portico, Greek Revival in style, projects from the central bay and over the one-story porch.  A large rear addition was made to the house circa 1890.  It was added to the National Register of Historic Places on August 14, 1998.

References

National Register of Historic Places in Sumter County, Alabama
Houses on the National Register of Historic Places in Alabama
Greek Revival houses in Alabama
Victorian architecture in Alabama
I-houses in Alabama
Houses in Sumter County, Alabama
Houses completed in 1880